Amata pryeri is a species of moth of the family Erebidae first described by George Hampson in 1898. It is found on Borneo and Java.

References 

pryeri
Moths described in 1898
Moths of Asia